The South Australian Railways O Class (1st) locomotives were built by Baldwin Locomotive Works for the South Australian Railways (SAR). They entered service in 1881 on the SAR system and were both withdrawn and scrapped by 1904.

History
Their main job was hauling goods trains on the Intercolonial Railway. When they were first in service they became the largest locomotives on the SAR system. They were unsuccessful on the Adelaide Hills line and were later diverted to work on the Northern line. With the great success of the new 4-6-0 R class locomotives that arrived in 1886, the two O class locomotives were withdrawn from service and scrapped in 1904, with a relatively short working life of 23 years.

References

Broad gauge locomotives in Australia
O1
Baldwin locomotives
2-8-0 locomotives
Railway locomotives introduced in 1881